Browsh is a web browser that can be run from terminal client environments such as ssh and Mosh or from a web browser client. It represents web pages as text.

Technology
The Browsh web browser represents web pages as text and can be run either from a terminal client environment or from a web browser.   the web browser client remains less developed. It has been developed since 23 April 2016. It uses Go as a core part of its implementation. Browsh uses a headless version of Mozilla Firefox to fetch and parse web pages.

Reception
This may be seen as a modern replacement for the Lynx text-based web browser. Others have felt displaying the web in text is impractical.

References

External links
 

2018 software